The DDB Mudra Group, a part of the DDB Worldwide Communications Group, is an advertising holding company. It was earlier known as Mudra Communications Limited and Mudra India. It also started Mudra Institute of Communications Ahmedabad which is considered India's first academic institution dedicated to communications and advertising studies.  In 2011, Mudra group was acquired by Omnicom Group, subsequently rebranded as DDB Mudra group and merged with DDB Worldwide.  As an advertising agency it is credited with handling successful campaigns of brands and products such as Castrol, Dabur, Future Group, Gulf Oil, and Volkswagen.

History

Mudra Ahmedabad was founded by A.G Krishnamurthy on 25 March 1980 as an offshoot of Reliance Industries' advertising division. Initially it had only 15 employees, 500 sq.ft space and Rs 40,000 as startup capital. Its first client was Vimal. 25 March is still celebrated across all Mudra offices as Mudra Day. In 1982, it picked up another client  Rasna.

In 1990, Mudra signed a collaboration agreement with DDB Needham Worldwide. In 2011, ADA Reliance decided to sell majority of stocks to Omnicom, parent of DDB.

In 2013 DDB acquired 22Feet Tribal World Digital Agency and head office is based in Bengaluru

Clients

The DDB Mudra Group's clients include Aircel, Arvind Stores, Akai, Ashok Leyland, Asian Paints, BPCL, Bank of Baroda, Baxter, Castrol, Cipla, Colgate, Cycle Pure Agarbathies, Dabur, Emirates, Emami, Federal Bank, Future Group, Gillette India, Godrej, Gulf Oil, HDFC Bank, HPCL, Hindustan Unilever, HP, IDBI Bank Group, ITC, Jaypee, Jyothy Laboratories - Henkel, ICICI Prudential Mutual Funds, Idea Cellular, Johnson & Johnson, Kalyan Silks, Kerala Tourism Development Corporation, LIC, Lavasa, L&T, McDonald's, MSD, Malayala Manorama, Mother Dairy, Nestle, Nirmal Lifestyle, Novartis, PepsiCo, Peter England, Philips Healthcare, Policybazaar.com, Raymond, Reebok, Rotomac, Sab Miller, Shell, Star India, Standard Chartered Bank, Symphony, Tata Communications, Tourism Australia, TTK Prestige, UNICEF, Union Bank of India, United Spirits, Videocon, Volkswagen, Western Union, World Gold Council, Worldwide Media, Wipro, Wrigley, YOU Broadband and Zydus.

Notable campaigns
DDB Mudra's first campaign was the launch of apparel and textile brand Vimal with tagline 'Only Vimal'. Its second notable campaign was the launch of soft drink concentrate Rasna with tagline 'I love you Rasna' in 1983.In 1986, Rasna became India's largest selling soft drink concentrate. In 1998 Mudra positioned Peter England apparel brand as 'The Honest Shirt' helping achieve sales of 2 million shirts. It also coined the baseline for LIC, 'Zindagi ke saath bhi, zindagi ke baad bhi' which continues to be used till today.

Controversies
Mudra has been in many controversies regarding false claims and questionable originality of their work. In 2010, they returned the Crystal Award at Goafest after their campaign captioned 'Subtitles' for HBO was found to be duplication of work previously done elsewhere

References

External links

http://www.afaqs.com/news/story/29779_Sudarshan-Banerjee-to-head-Ignite-Mudra;-Chandan-Nath-to-continue-as-advisor

Digital marketing companies of India
Companies based in Ahmedabad
Companies established in 1980
1980 establishments in Gujarat